Meranoplus loebli, is a species of ant of the subfamily Myrmicinae. It is found in Sri Lanka.

References

External links

 at antwiki.org

Myrmicinae
Hymenoptera of Asia
Insects described in 1998